A button is a small fastener which secures two pieces of fabric together.

Button may also refer to:

Controls
 Button (computing), a virtual control displayed on a computer screen that can control software
 Push-button, a switch meant to control a machine or a process
 Web button, or button graphic, a digital image used to represent a link to a specific web location

Arts and entertainment
 The Button (comics), a comic book cross-over event
 The Button (TV series)
 Button (film), a 1982 Soviet animated film
 Buttons (film), a 1927 American film
 "Buttons" (The Pussycat Dolls song), from PCD
 "Buttons" (Sia song), from Some People Have Real Problems
 Buttons (pantomime), a character in the Cinderella pantomime
 Buttons, of Buttons and Mindy, a cartoon dog from the children's TV show Animaniacs

Sports and games
 Button (curling), the center of the playing surface in the sport of curling
 Button (poker), a marker indicating which player is currently the dealer
 The Button (Reddit), a meta-game and social experiment

Places
 Button Bay, Lake Champlain, Vermont, United States
 Button Island (Massachusetts), United States
 Button Islands, Nunavut, Canada
 Button Township, Ford County, Illinois, United States
 The Buttons, Argentine islands

Plants and animals
 Buttons (plant), several genera of plants in the family Asteraceae
 Button mushroom, sometimes shortened to just "button"
 The initial segment formed in the development of a rattlesnake's rattle

People
 Button (name), an English surname
 Button Gwinnett (1735–1777), a signer of the United States Declaration of Independence
 Red Buttons (1919–2006), stage name of American comedian and actor Aaron Chwatt

Other uses
 Button baronets, an extinct title (1622–1712) in the Baronetage of England
 The Button (sculpture), on the campus of the University of Pennsylvania
 Button railway station, Button, Manitoba, Canada
 Button's Coffee House London, England
 Cadbury Buttons, packets of button-shaped pieces of chocolate sold in the UK

See also
 Button, Button (disambiguation)
 
 
 Buton, Indonesia